At 3:20pm on 30 January 1995, a bomb exploded on a busy street in central Algiers, Algeria. It was a suicide car bombing which used over 220 pounds of explosives. It was detonated in front of a bank office, across the street from Algiers' police headquarters and near to the city's main post office and train station. It killed 42 people and injured over 250 others.

The bombing was perpetrated by the Armed Islamic Group of Algeria (GIA) and occurred during the Algerian Civil War.

Algiers was also bombed on 26 August 1992, and in 2007 on 11 April and 11 December.

See also
 List of terrorist incidents, 1995

References

1995 in Algeria
1995 murders in Algeria
January 1995 bombing
20th-century mass murder in Africa
Armed Islamic Group of Algeria
Attacks on bank buildings
Attacks on buildings and structures in 1995
Attacks on buildings and structures in Algeria
Attacks on police stations in the 1990s
January 1995 bombing
Improvised explosive device bombings in Algeria
Islamic terrorist incidents in 1995
January 1995 crimes
January 1995 events in Africa
Mass murder in 1995
Mass murder in Algeria
Suicide bombings in 1995
Suicide car and truck bombings in Algeria
Terrorist incidents in Algeria in 1995
Building bombings in Africa